The New Orleans mayoral election of 1969-1970 resulted in the election of Moon Landrieu as mayor of New Orleans.  This election also saw an unexpectedly strong showing for a Republican candidate; the party had previously had negligible support in the city.

Incumbent mayor Victor H. Schiro was term-limited after winning elections in 1961 and 1965.

Candidates 
Major candidates in the Democratic primary included:
former State Representative and City Councilman-at-Large Moon Landrieu,
Jimmy Fitzmorris, former City Councillor from 1954 to 1966
future Louisiana Attorney General and current State Senator William J. Guste
City Councillor-at-Large John J. Petre had previously been a state legislator.
Judge David Gertler was well financed and had strong support from the city's Jewish community
Orleans Parish School Board President Lloyd J. Rittiner

Results 
First Democratic Party Primary, November 8, 1969

Second Democratic Party Primary, December 13, 1969

General Election, 1970

Sources 
 Orleans Parish Democratic Executive Committee. First and Second Democratic Primary Elections, 1969.
 Fitzmorris, James E.  Frankly, Fitz!  Pelican, 1992.

1969
1969 United States mayoral elections
New Orleans
1969 Louisiana elections
1970 Louisiana elections